Anton Benya (born October 8, 1912 in Vienna, died December 5, 2001) was an Austrian politician (with the Social Democratic Party of Austria) and trade unionist. He was President of the National Council from 1971 to 1986.

Honours and awards
 Grand Decoration of Honour in Gold for Services to the Republic of Austria (1972)
 Commander's Cross with Star of Burgenland (1972)
 Grand Gold Medal with Star for Services to the City of Vienna (1972)
 Gold Medal of the French Senate (1972)
 Grand Cross of the Order of Merit of the Italian Republic (1972)
 Grand Cordon of the Order of Merit of the Republic of Poland (1974)
 Grand Cross of the Order of Merit of the Federal Republic of Germany (1975)
 Decoration for Services to the Liberation of Austria (1977)
 Honorary Citizen of the City of Vienna (1977)
 Grand Cross of the Order of the Dannebrog (Denmark, 1979)
 Grand Cross of the Order of Isabel the Catholic (Spain, 1979)
 Commander Grand Cross of the Order of the Polar Star (Sweden, 1980)
 Carinthian provincial Order in Gold (1982)
 Medal of the French President in silver (1982)
 Honorary Diploma of the City Council of Eisenerz (1983)
 Grand Cross of the Order of Christ (Portugal, 1984)
 Grand Cross of the Order of the White Rose of Finland (1985)
 Medal for service to the Parliament of the People's Republic of Poland (1986)
 Medal of Europe in silver
 Grand Cross of the National Order of Merit (France)
 Grand Cross of the Order of Honour (Greece) 
 Medal for Merit in resistance against fascism (Czechoslovakia)
 Order of the Yugoslav Great Star
 Order of Tudor Vladimirescu, 1st class (Romania) 
 Order of the Renaissance, 1st class (Jordan)
 Gold Medal of the Parliament of South Africa
 Order of the Golden Heart, 2nd class (Kenya)
 Ring of honor in Gold of the Mineworkers Federation of Bolivia
 Medal of the Greater London Council in Silver
 Medal from the Mayor of Vienna
 Honorary Medal of the Vienna University of Economics and Business

References

1912 births
2001 deaths
Politicians from Vienna
Social Democratic Party of Austria politicians
Presidents of the National Council (Austria)
Austrian trade unionists
Recipients of the Grand Decoration for Services to the Republic of Austria
Knights Grand Cross of the Order of Merit of the Italian Republic
Grand Crosses of the Order of Merit of the Republic of Poland
Grand Crosses 1st class of the Order of Merit of the Federal Republic of Germany
Recipients of the Decoration for Services to the Liberation of Austria
Grand Crosses of the Order of the Dannebrog
Knights Grand Cross of the Order of Isabella the Catholic
Commanders Grand Cross of the Order of the Polar Star
Grand Crosses of the Order of Christ (Portugal)
Grand Cross of the Ordre national du Mérite
Grand Crosses of the Order of Honour (Greece)
Grand Crosses of the Order of the Golden Heart